1999 in Ghana details events of note that happened in Ghana in the year 1999.

Incumbents
 President: Jerry John Rawlings
 Vice President: John Atta Mills
 Chief Justice: Isaac Kobina Abban

Events

January

February

March
6 March - 42nd independence anniversary
15 March - President Rawlings attends a state dinner held in his honour by U.S. President Bill Clinton.

April

May

June

July
1st - Republic day celebrations held across the country.

August
14th - President Jerry Rawlings attends the burial service for the late Okyenhene, Osagyefo Kuntunkununku II at Kibi.

September

October

November

December

Deaths
22 April - Former vice-president Joseph W.S. de Graft-Johnson dies in London after a short illness.

National holidays
 January 1: New Year's Day
 March 6: Independence Day
 May 1: Labor Day
 December 25: Christmas
 December 26: Boxing day

In addition, several other places observe local holidays, such as the foundation of their town. These are also "special days."

References